The women's parallel slalom competition of the Sochi 2014 Olympics was held at Rosa Khutor Extreme Park on 22 February 2014.

Schedule
All times are (UTC+4).

Results
The event was started at 09:15.

Qualification

Elimination round

Final standings

References

Women's snowboarding at the 2014 Winter Olympics